Vad may refer to:

Geography

Romania
Vad, Cluj, a commune in Cluj County
Vad, a village in Șercaia Commune, Brașov County
Vad, a village in Copalnic-Mănăștur Commune, Maramureș County
Vad, a village in Dragomirești Commune, Neamț County
Vadu (Vád), a village in Sântămăria-Orlea Commune, Hunedoara County
Vaduri, a village in Alexandru cel Bun Commune, Neamț County
Vadurile, a village in Iana Commune, Vaslui County
Vad (Olt), a tributary of the Olt
Vad (Someș), a tributary of the Someș
Vad, alternative name for the river Ocolișel, tributary of the Arieș

Other
Vad, Russia, name of several rural localities in Russia
Vad (Moksha), a river in Russia, tributary of the river Moksha
Vad, Dalarna, Sweden
Vaud, (by Romansh name) a canton in Switzerland

People
István Vad (born 1979), Hungarian football referee
Katalin Vad (born 1980), Hungarian actress
Ninetta Vad (born 1989), Hungarian sprint canoer

Other
VadPress, an imprint of the German group VDM Publishing devoted to the reproduction of Wikipedia content

See also
VAD (disambiguation)
Vadu (disambiguation)